Hooda is a surname of Jat people primarily found in Haryana, Rajasthan and Western Uttar Pradesh in India.

Notable people bearing the name Hooda include:
Ashish Hooda
Bhupinder Singh Hooda
Deepak Hooda
Deepender Singh Hooda
Deependra Singh Hooda
Mohit Hooda
Ranbir Singh Hooda
Randeep Hooda
Pukharaj Hooda